The Christian Front was an anti-Semitic political association active in the United States from 1938 to 1940, started in response to radio priest Charles Coughlin. The Christian Front was mainly based in New York City and many of its members were Irish and German American Catholics. Their activities included distributing like-minded publications and participating in rallies. After the American government began investigations in the late 1930s, a few members were arrested and prosecuted. The trials of these members discredited the entire movement and by the end of 1940, the Christian Front was no longer active.

History

The Christian Front was founded in November 1938 in response to the prompting of radio priest Charles Coughlin, who had called for a "crusade against the anti-Christian forces of the Red Revolution" in the May 23, 1938, edition of his newspaper, Social Justice. Its membership numbered several thousand and consisted mostly of Irish-Americans in New York City. They sold Social Justice, organized boycotts of Jewish businesses, and held parades and rallies. They made no distinction between "Reds" and Jews. Their rallies welcomed attendees from like-minded organizations like the German American Bund and Crusaders for Americanism. They heard speakers denounce Jews as international bankers, war mongers, and communists, mock President Roosevelt as Rosenvelt, and praise Franco and Hitler.  The Roman Catholic Bishop of Brooklyn, Thomas Molloy, was a prominent supporter and his diocesan newspaper, the Tablet once addressed the charge that the Christian Front was antisemitic: "Well what of it? Just what law was violated?"

The Front also targeted organized labor and tried to replace union officials, deemed too radical or Jewish, with "Christian leadership".

The Christian Front participated in the February 20, 1939, Nazi rally held in Madison Square Garden organized by the German American Bund. According to James Wechsler, the Christian Front was the critical component in taking Coughlin's message into action. It was, he wrote, "the dynamic core of the movement. It calls the mass meetings, floods the city with leaflets, and rallies the crowds under its own signature." For several months in 1939, Jews were harassed and attacked on the streets of New York City by thugs generally associated with the Front. Violent incidents including beatings and stabbings. New York City police infiltrated the organization and obtained more than a hundred convictions for the assaults.

In September 1939, the editors of Equality magazine published a 15-page letter to Cardinal Francis Spellman of New York asking him to state his position on the Front and warning its activities might "culminate in a violent, bloody rioting such as the city has never known." It said the Front's members were 90 percent Catholics and warned that "continued silence on this extremely serious question ... will be interpreted as implicit sanction of the Christian Front in this city". Among those signing the letter were Franz Boas, Bennet Cerf, Moss Hart, Lillian Hellman, and Dorothy Parker. In November, the Brooklyn Church and Mission Federation, which represented almost every Protestant congregation in that borough, warned Protestants against the Front, calling it "evil and unchristian". Look magazine covered the violence in September and October, including photos. In December, after New York radio station WMCA announced it would no longer carry Coughlin's weekly sermons, Christian Front members organized protests every Sunday for weeks at the offices of the station, its advertisers, and Jewish-owned businesses.

A faction of the Christian Front that supported cooperation with the German American Bund and an escalation on the violence against Jews and Communists splintered in 1939. The splinter group was led by Joe McWilliams. Coughlin refused to accept donations from the members of the group.

Investigation by the government
At the urging of the U.S. attorney for New York, the U.S. Department of Justice decided to target the Front. On December 28, 1939, U.S. Attorney General Frank Murphy announced that a grand jury in Washington, D.C., would hear evidence of organized antisemitism and other activities that might be fomented by foreign agents. He promised to find ways to prosecute those involved using the tax code and whatever statutes might prove useful. In January 1940, federal agents arrested 17 men, all residents of Brooklyn and mostly Front members, and charged that they had conspired to "overthrow, put down and destroy by force the Government of the United States" and planned to steal weapons and ammunition to do so. J. Edgar Hoover suggested there were collaborators in Boston and Philadelphia. Their cache of weapons included an old saber and an 1873 Springfield rifle. Coughlin responded to the arrests with a statement of support, calling the Front "pro-American, pro-Christian, anti-Communist and anti-Nazi". The Catholic magazine Commonweal expressed sympathy for those arrested, saying in an editorial that Coughlin, The Tablet, and Social Justice were responsible for creating this group of "hypnotized men". 

The arrestees were indicted February 8, 1940 in Brooklyn, "on charges of seditious conspiracy and stealing Federal munitions and property."

One government official admitted off the record that the Front was really being prosecuted for un-Americanism. The charges did not mention antisemitism or Coughlin. The jurors proved sympathetic to the defendants and returned no verdict. The federal government dropped its charges in 1941, at which point the new Attorney General, Robert Jackson, called the charges "a bit fantastic". One historian has called the trial an exercise in "public relations" that exaggerated the danger posed by "a pathetic bunch." Another said that "the trial revealed the Christian Fronters to be a group of unbalanced cranks and successfully discredited the entire movement."

According to historian Rev. Charles R. Gallagher, S.J., declassified FBI documents assert that the Brooklyn Christian Front members engaged in military training, sought to carry out a wide range of attacks, and were in possession of weaponry that included Browning automatic rifles. Local supporters in New York City demonstrated on their behalf after their trial.

In 1940, Francis Moran, who ran the Boston Christian Front, was recruited as a German agent by German consul Herbert Scholz. The Boston Christian Front office, located in the Copley Square Hotel, was shut down in 1942 thanks to the efforts of Frances Sweeney and with the help of the British; the Christian Front continued to operate clandestinely in the city until 1945.

See also
 1939 Nazi rally at Madison Square Garden
 Frances Sweeney, activist who waged a "one-woman crusade" against the Christian Front in Boston

References

Additional reading
Bayor, Ronald H. Neighbors in Conflict: The Irish, Germans, Jews, and Italians of New York City, 1929-1941 (University of Illinois Press, 1988)

McCarthy, Edward C. The Christian Front Movement in New York City, 1938-1940 (1965)

Norwood, Stephen H. " Marauding Youth and the Christian Front: Antisemitic Violence in Boston and New York During World War II", American Jewish History, Vol. 91, No. 2, June 2003, pp. 233–67, JSTOR

External links
Norman Thomas, "What's Behind the 'Christian Front'?", (Workers Defense League, August 17, 1939)

Anti-communist organizations in the United States
Antisemitism in the United States
Organizations established in 1938
1938 establishments in the United States
Late modern Christian antisemitism
Far-right organizations in the United States